Charentonnay is a commune in the Cher department in the Centre-Val de Loire region of France.

Geography
The commune lies on the pilgrimage route known as the Way of St. James.

Population

Sights
 The church of St. Pierre, dating from the fourteenth century.
 A fifteenth century chateau.

See also
Communes of the Cher department

References

Communes of Cher (department)